Iñigo Manrique de Lara (died April 1485) was a Roman Catholic prelate who served as Archbishop of Seville (1483–1485), Bishop of Jaén (1475–1483), Bishop of Coria (1457–1475), and Bishop of Oviedo (1444–1457).

Biography
In 1444, Iñigo Manrique de Lara was selected by the King of Spain and confirmed by Pope Eugene IV as Bishop of Oviedo. In 1457, he was appointed by Pope Callixtus III as Bishop of Coria. In 1475, he was appointed by Pope Sixtus IV as Bishop of Jaén. On 15 January 1483, he was appointed by Pope Sixtus IV as Archbishop of Seville where he served until his death in April 1485.

See also 
 Catholic Church in Spain

References

External links and additional sources
 (for Chronology of Bishops)
 (for Chronology of Bishops)
 (for Chronology of Bishops) 
 (for Chronology of Bishops) 
 (for Chronology of Bishops) 
 (for Chronology of Bishops) 
 (for Chronology of Bishops) 
 (for Chronology of Bishops) 

1485 deaths
15th-century Roman Catholic archbishops in Castile
Bishops appointed by Pope Eugene IV
Bishops appointed by Pope Callixtus III
Bishops appointed by Pope Sixtus IV